Uthumphon Maha Thammarachathirat III or Uthumphon Mahaphon Phinit (c. 1733– 1796) was the 32nd and penultimate monarch of the Ayutthaya Kingdom, ruling in 1758 for about three months. Facing various throne claimants, Uthumphon was finally forced to abdicate and enter monkhood. His preference of being a monk rather than keeping the throne earned him the epithet "Khun Luang Ha Wat", or "the king who lives in the temple".

His memorial tomb is located in the Lin Zin Gon (Kone) cemetery in Amarapura, about 500m north east of the U Bein Bridge.

Reign and abdication
Prince Dok Ma Duea or Prince Uthumphon — "Dok Duea" (ดอกเดื่อ) and "Uthumphon" (อุทุมพร), both meaning udumbhara or "fig", was a son of Borommakot. In 1746, his elder brother Prince Thammathibet, who had been appointed as the Front Palace, was beaten to death for his affair with one of Borommakot's concubines. Borommakot did not appoint a new Front Palace, as Kromma Khun Anurak Montri or Ekkathat, the next in the line of succession, proved to be incompetent. In 1757, Borommakot finally decided to skip Anurak Montri altogether and made Uthumphon the Front Palace—becoming Kromma Khun Phon Phinit.

In 1758, upon the passing of Borommakot, Uthumphon was crowned. However, he faced oppositions from his three half-brothers, namely, Kromma Muen Chit Sunthon, Kromma Muen Sunthon Thep, and Kromma Muen Sep Phakdi. Uthumphon had his half-brothers arrested and executed.

Ekkathat, forced to become a monk, decided to leave the priesthood and seek the throne. Uthumphon then gave up his throne to his brother and entered a monastery as a monk.

Burmese invasions

In 1760, Alaungpaya of Burma led his armies invading Ayutthaya. Uthumphon was asked to leave the monastery to fight against the Burmese.  However, Alaungpaya was wounded during the siege, and died during the subsequent Burmese retreat.

Uthumphon, once again, returned to the Pradu Rongtham monastery.

The Burmese, however, came back in 1767 under the commission of Hsinbyushin and led by Ne Myo Thihapate. Ayutthaya under Ekkathat was in turmoil, without authorities or powers to counter the Burmese invaders.

Though he was strongly urged to take role in leading Siamese armies, Uthumphon chose to stay in the monk status. Ayutthaya finally fell. Uthumphon was captured by the Burmese forces and was brought to Burma along with a large number of Ayutthayan people.

Later life

Uthumphon was resettled near Ava, along with other Ayutthaya ex-nobles, numbering over 2,000 princes and princesses and their entourages, and over 800 queens bearing titles. At Ava, the history, government, and ceremonies of the Ayutthayan court were documented in a Burmese language chronicle called the Yodaya Chronicle (ယိုးဒယားရာဇဝင်). The Yodaya Chronicle was later translated back into Thai, entitled Ayutthayan affidavit or The Testimony of the King who Entered a Wat although there is no evidence that Uthumphon provided input into the testimony.

Hsinbyushin built a village near Mandalay for Uthumphon and his Siamese people—who then became the Yodaya people. Per Burmese chronicles, Uthumphon remained in the village, living as a monk until his death in 1796.

Legacy
On 29 June 2013, Burmese and Thai authorities announced that the site of Utumphon's memorial tomb would be renovated and turned into a historical park. Since February 2013, a joint Burmese-Thai excavation team of archaeologists, uncovered bones and fragments of a monk's robes in a gilt glass mosaic alms bowl containing bones and robes. The Thai restoration team is expected to spend  on the project. In late 2013, archaeologists uncovered a brick structure believed to be a monastery that once held stone inscriptions. The team has laid out plans for a  memorial ground and is seeking the permission of local authorities to establish a cultural heritage centre there, including restoration of the royal graveyard complex, at a cost of at least 39 million baht.

Ancestry

Notes

References

 

|-

Kings of Ayutthaya
Ban Phlu Luang dynasty
18th-century monarchs in Asia
Thai male Chao Fa
Princes of Ayutthaya
18th-century Thai people
18th-century Thai monarchs